Liston may refer to:
 Liston (square), a Venetian word for a part of the city, usually a square or section of a square.
 Liston (surname)
 Liston, Essex, a hamlet in England
 Liston, New South Wales, a village in Australia
 Liston College, a New Zealand secondary school

See also 
 J. J. Liston Trophy, Australian-rules football award
 Kirkliston, a village in Scotland